38 Degrees is a British not-for-profit political-activism organisation. It describes itself as "progressive" and claims to "campaign for fairness, defend rights, promote peace, preserve the planet and deepen democracy in the UK".

38 Degrees takes its name from "the angle at which snowflakes come together to form an avalanche".

Background 
The organisation launched on 26 May 2009. The 38 Degrees website states: "38 Degrees was founded by a group of activists and funders concerned about the state of our democracy and determined to try something different. Founders include Gordon Roddick, Henry Tinsley, Pete Myers and Paul Hilder. The project was developed by Ben Brandzel, Nina Kowalska, David Babbs and Warren Puckett. 38 Degrees was founded in memory of Anita Roddick, a lifetime champion of the power of ordinary people to make a difference." Gordon Roddick was previously co-founder of The Body Shop and  Henry Tinsley was ex-chairman of Green & Black's chocolate. The organisation launched during the United Kingdom parliamentary expenses scandal, and this formed the backdrop to early campaigns demanding voters were given more powers to sack MPs.

The Executive Director from launch until April 2019 was David Babbs. Babbs was formerly Head of Activism at Friends of the Earth where he was responsible for the Big Ask Campaign. Babbs also previously worked at People & Planet. Other early staff included Hannah Lownsborough and Johnny Chatterton.

At launch 38 Degrees said it was inspired by groups like MoveOn in the United States, GetUp! in Australia and Avaaz globally. These organisations all use the internet to mobilise people and connect them and their governments.

Structure 
38 Degrees is a not-for-profit company limited by guarantee. It was previously registered as Progressive Majority. It has a decentralised and informal structure, with management above a flat-line membership structure. 38 Degrees also claims its campaigns are selected by its members under its "Campaigns by You".

Personnel 
David Babbs was the founding Executive Director. In this capacity he signed off some emails, appeared in the media and frequently spoke at local 38 Degrees events. He  also represented 38 Degrees in front of parliamentary select committees. Babbs describes his motivation for campaigning as coming from "a gut feeling that things could be better, politically, socially, and environmentally and that the reason they're not is largely due to the conscious actions of powerful people rather than due to bad luck or any sort of natural order. Campaigning together is how we work together to challenge that and change things.". In December 2011 Babbs was named by the Independent Newspaper as one of their "Great Britons" for his role in halting a government plan to sell off public forests. In September 2017, Babbs was listed at Number 93 on commentator Iain Dale's list of the '100 most influential people on the Left'.

In April 2019 38 Degrees announced that Babbs had been dismissed from his position as Executive Director following an internal investigation which found that he had shared illegal drugs with other members of staff. 38 Degrees stated that a further investigation was underway into other allegations, which weren't detailed.

Methodology
38 Degrees describes itself as a people-powered and multi-issue movement. It aims to empower British citizens by providing easy ways for them to take action on the issues they care about, e.g., climate change, human rights and poverty. It claims "it's 38 Degrees members who set priorities and we decide on what we campaign on together". They publish the results of their membership polls on their website. While 38 Degrees refers to 'members', there is no formal membership and these are simply people on its email mailing list.

Each week 50,000 members, chosen at random, are asked to vote for their top priorities; only ones where there is a strong consensus will be pushed forward. On occasion the whole membership is invited to take part in votes to decide the organisation's position on a newsworthy issue. For example, a poll in September 2014 found that members were evenly split on whether to support or oppose military action targeting ISIS in Iraq. As a result, 38 Degrees took no position.

Funding comes from small individual donations. The average donation is about £10 but a plea to fund a legal challenge to zero hours contracts asked for just £1 and received 11,000 responses within 48 hours. Part of its success comes from the speed with which 38 Degrees can launch a campaign or find out members' views.

Campaigning techniques include both online methods, such as mass email, social media, blogs and online petitions, and offline methods, such as calling an MP or visiting a surgery. 38 Degrees has also fundraised from its membership to commission legal advice and to run advertising campaigns.

Criticism
 Cheltenham Conservative Member of Parliament (MP) Alex Chalk accused 38 Degrees of a "misleading" advertising campaign after they drove a billboard round his constituency criticising him for his role in the NHS crisis. Chalk described the group as "a worrying development in British politics".
 38 Degrees was accused of using "militarist" language in an email encouraging members to take part in a vote to decide 38 Degrees' position on British military action against ISIS in Iraq in 2014. The poll resulted in a split vote and 38 Degrees took no position – angering peace campaigners.
 38 Degrees has been criticised, particularly by some MPs for running campaigns which they consider to be biased and amounting to little more than spam.
  Conservative MP Dominic Raab criticised 38 Degrees for allowing members to send "clone emails" to MPs via its website.
 A number of government politicians strongly criticised 38 Degrees members for their actions campaigning against changes to the NHS. Lord Tyler, described 38 Degrees members as a "rent a mob". In 2011 Transport Minister Simon Burns described 38 Degrees members as "almost zombie like" for following 38 Degrees without question.
 38 Degrees has been accused of "alarmism" and "scaremongering" during the passage of the Transparency of Lobbying, Non-party Campaigning and Trade Union Administration Bill, which 38 Degrees has claimed is a "gagging law".
 Some sources, including Conservative MP David Davies, have accused 38 Degrees, which claims not to be affiliated to a political party, of being left-wing and of having links to the Labour Party. The blog site 38 Degrees debunked, which is run by a Conservative councillor states that "Although 38 Degrees professes to be 'not connected with any political parties' it is intensely political as are its campaigns. On first sight its position seems to be a mixture of mainstream Social Democratic and Green". Conservative MP Robert Halfon described 38 Degrees as "a mass database of centrist/floating voters, albeit with a sizeable minority from the centre left...[which is]...controlled by leftists". 38 Degrees has denied these claims.
 38 Degrees' involvement in the October 2015 public consultation into the renewal of the BBC Charter was criticised. It generated a large number of responses which the critics said may be biased to a particular viewpoint; and therefore not representative of the larger population as a whole. Of the 192,000 submissions it was found that 177,000 resulted from its rallying call to help defend the corporation from political interference. The larger than expected response significantly increased the cost and time required to analyse the results.
In 2019 it organised a survey in response to an NHS England consultation. They asked "To what extent do you agree the law should be changed so that contracts to run NHS services no longer have to be put up for auction?" Of 173,750 survey respondents 89% said they strongly agreed; 6% that they agreed; 1% disagreed; 3% strongly disagreed; and 1% said they were neutral. There were nearly 200,000 responses in all - much the biggest response NHS England has seen.  The Independent Healthcare Providers Network complained that the question was misleading, as only 2% of NHS services by value were let by competitive tender.  They said credible research organisations like ComRes and Ipsos MORI had "shown repeatedly that a representative sample of the public are entirely comfortable with independent organisations delivering NHS care".
In relation to 38 Degrees' reaction to the proposal to sell off the Public Forest Estate, former Prime Minister David Cameron said that the organisation would "jump onto any bandwagon and fill MPs' postbags with endless cut-and-paste objections".

See also 
 Internet activism
 UK Parliament petitions website

References

External links 
 

Political advocacy groups in the United Kingdom
Internet-based activism
Non-profit organisations based in the United Kingdom
2009 establishments in the United Kingdom
Organizations established in 2009
Online petitions